Bernard de Wolff (1 November 1955 in Amsterdam) is a Dutch painter of contemporary cityscapes, cows, landscapes and nudes. His work is represented in art collections in the Netherlands, France, Germany, Sweden, Italy, the United Kingdom, Belgium, Denmark, Suriname, the United States, Canada, Japan, New Zealand, South Africa, India, Russia, Ukraine, Brazil, Israel and China.

Life
Bernard de Wolff studied Art History at the University of Amsterdam between 1982 and 1988. During his study he in-depth on classical archeology, cultural anthropology, cultural anthropology, theatrical media, aesthetics and cultural philosophy. He travelled multiple times to West Africa, experiences which contributed to his evolvement as an artist. His first art exhibition was in 1982 at gallery Memphis in The Hague. In 1988 he graduated as an art historian. During the 1980s Bernard de Wolff worked on some video productions, for example for the Allard Piersonmuseum (Amsterdam). His program “De streling” (“The caress”) was nominated for the Sony Video Award and “De Olympische Orde” (The Olympic Order”) was selected for the NVWFT Mediaprice. He is also responsible for the scenario and the music.

After his graduation Bernard de Wolff further developed himself as a painter. During the 1990s his art exhibitions led him to the United States where he lectured on the art of painting landscapes. Important for his artistic development were his journeys to Suriname and Brazil in the 21st century. Also the city life of Amsterdam and Paris are a ubiquitously important source of inspiration for his work. However, ever since 2015 the Orient became an important source of inspiration. In 2016 Bernard de Wolff traveled, on invitation of the Chinese Academy of Art (division of the Department of the Culture, China) to Wushan China to experience the Chinese landscape for new landscape paintings. The exposition will is due 2017. Nevertheless, in 2015 and 2016 Bernard de Wolff already exposed his art at exhibitions in respectively, Jinan, Shanghai and Beijing.

Currently, Bernard de Wolff lives In Paris, France where he is represented by art galleries among which the prestigious Schwab Beaubourg Gallery.

Style
The artwork of Bernard de Wolff is characterized by his impressionism, while using expressive techniques. The oil paint is not just a medium to create an impression on the canvas, but as a substance, it is also an essential part of the artwork; the oil paint is present, visible, tangible. De Wolff's work is inspired by George Hendrik Breitner, Willem Witsen, Marius Bauer, Eugène Leroy and Karel Appel. Main themes are contemporary cityscape, landscapes, cattle and nudes.

Art work
Some artworks are:
Gare Du Nord, Last train.
Row the Boat.
Canal.
La Ville.
Boulevard.
XVIeme Arrondissement.
Wandeling in de Stad (Stroll in the City).
Bois de Boulogne.
Are You Looking at Me.

Awards
 1980s
Nomination Sony Video Award for the program “De streling” (“The caress”)
Nomination NVWFT Mediaprice for the documentary “De Olympische Orde” ("The Olympic Order")
 2000s
Winner Brooklyn Gallery Award (2002)
Winner Bronze Calla (2002)
Election top hundred contemporary Dutch artists, kunstweek.nl, position 21 (2008)

Trivia
In 2005, in celebration of his fiftieth birthday, a book regarding Bernard de Wolff was released in courtesy of Galery Peter Leen.

References

External links
Homepage of the artist
Homepage with photographs of recent work

Dutch painters
Dutch male painters
1955 births
Living people
Dutch landscape painters
Cityscape artists
Painters from Amsterdam